Baggies may refer to:
Baggies, made by Pactiv Corporation, were the first brand of food storage bags; Hefty® and Baggies® are registered trademarks of Pactiv Corporation
Baggies (trousers), a type of pants worn (primarily popular with the Southern California beach/surf culture) in the late 1950s and 1960s and re-popularized in the 1980s
Baggies (boardshorts), another name for boardshorts, especially in South Africa
Baggy, a British dance-oriented music genre
"The Baggie" or "the Hefty Bag", part of the right-field wall of the Hubert H. Humphrey Metrodome in Minneapolis, Minnesota, US
"The Baggies", a nickname for West Bromwich Albion F.C. 
”Baggies”, slang for baggy cycling shorts.